Emily Chan (born August 11, 1997) is an American pair skater. With her skating partner, Spencer Howe, she is a two-time Four Continents silver medalist (2022 and 2023) silver medalist, a two-time Grand Prix silver medalist (2022 Skate America; 2022 NHK Trophy), and a two-time U.S. national medalist (silver in 2023; pewter in 2022).

Earlier in her career, she competed in women's singles, becoming the 2016 U.S. national junior champion and 2015 U.S. national novice champion.

Personal life 
Chan was born in Pasadena, Texas. She attended Fairmont Elementary School and Fairmont Junior High in Pasadena, and high school in McKinney, Texas. In addition to skating, she has also trained in Chinese modern dance and ballet.

Career

Single skating 
Chan competed at the novice level until the 2014–15 season. At the U.S. Championships, she finished sixth in 2013 and ninth in 2014 before winning the gold medal in 2015.

In 2015–16, Chan moved up to the junior level. She made her ISU Junior Grand Prix (JGP) debut in Bratislava, Slovakia, finishing sixth. She won the gold medal at the 2016 U.S. Championships. She trained in Plano, Texas, coached by Aleksey Letov.

Pair skating

Early years
Chan competed for three seasons in juvenile pairs with J. Daniel Vallecilla. In December 2008, the two won the juvenile title at the 2009 U.S. Junior Championships. Nicole Sciarrotta Nichols coached the pair in Texas.

Skating with Misha Mitrofanov, Chan placed eighth in novice pairs at the 2015 U.S. Championships

She teamed up with Spencer Howe in 2019, and the two decided to train at the Skating Club of Boston in Norwood, Massachusetts, coached by Aleksey Letov and Olga Ganicheva. In their second season together, Chan/Howe placed seventh at the 2020 Skate America and fifth at the 2021 U.S. Championships.

2021–22 season
Chan/Howe finished ninth at the 2021 CS Warsaw Cup. In January, they won pewter for fourth place at the 2022 U.S. Championships and were sent to the 2022 Four Continents Championships in Tallinn, Estonia. Ranked third in the short and second in the free, they moved ahead of Canada's Walsh/Michaud to take the silver medal behind fellow Americans Lu/Mitrofanov.

2022–23 season
The international pairs scene going into the 2022–23 season was greatly altered by the International Skating Union banning all Russian skaters in response to their country's invasion of Ukraine. With more podium opportunities for pairs outside of Russia, Chan/Howe began with a silver medal win at the 2022 CS U.S. Classic. Howe said that they were pleased with the outcome in light of injury troubles that had hindered their preparations. 

Given two Grand Prix assignments for the first time, they won the silver medal at the 2022 Skate Canada International. They won a second silver medal weeks later at the 2022 NHK Trophy, qualifying for the Grand Prix Final. Despite a jump error in the free skate, Chan said they were "very happy with our skate." Chan/Howe struggled at the Final, finishing sixth of six teams.

Chan/Howe won the silver medal at the 2023 U.S. Championships, a new best podium placement at the national championships. Chan said they were both "really grateful" for the result. With national champions Knierim/Frazier declining to attend the 2023 Four Continents Championships in favour of a paid appearance at Art on Ice, Chan/Howe became the highest-ranked American team in attendance at a home ISU championship. In the short program, Howe fell on his triple toe attempt, but they still placed third in the segment. In the free skate, they overtook Canadians Stellato/Deschamps for the silver medal, their second. Chan called it "a special moment for both of us."

Programs

With Howe

Single skating

Competitive highlights 
GP: Grand Prix; CS: Challenger Series; JGP: Junior Grand Prix. Pewter medals (fourth place) awarded only at U.S. national and subnational events.

Pairs with Howe

Pairs with Mitrofanov

Pairs with Vallecilla

Ladies singles

References

1997 births
Living people
American female single skaters
People from Pasadena, Texas
American female pair skaters
21st-century American women
Four Continents Figure Skating Championships medalists